Brynjólfur Andersen Willumsson (born Brynjólfur Darri Willumsson; 12 August 2000) is an Icelandic football striker who plays for Kristiansund BK.

Coming through the youth ranks of Breiðablik, he played three seasons for the senior team and was a prolific Icelandic youth international. Internationally, he was a squad member for the 2021 UEFA European Under-21 Championship.

After being scouted by Kenneth Leren, he was signed by Norwegian side Kristiansund BK in March 2021. He made his Eliteserien debut in May 2021 against Molde.

References

2000 births
Living people
People from Kópavogur
Brynjolfur Willumsson
Brynjolfur Willumsson
Brynjolfur Willumsson
Brynjolfur Willumsson
Kristiansund BK players
Brynjolfur Willumsson
Eliteserien players
Association football forwards
Brynjolfur Willumsson
Expatriate footballers in Norway
Brynjolfur Willumsson